is the 31st single by Japanese singer and voice actress Nana Mizuki, released on January 14, 2015 by King Records.

The full version MV wasn't released on YouTube; instead, it was included on Nana Clips 7.

Track listing 
 "Eden" (エデン)
Lyrics: Nana Mizuki
Composition: Shinichi Fujimori (Aobozu)
Arrangement: Hitoshi Fujima (Elements Garden)
Theme song (January Edition) for NTV Show Freshen Up! (スッキリ！！)
Theme song for animelo mix TV commercial
 "No Limit"
Lyrics: Nana Mizuki
Composition: Jun Suyama 
Arrangement: Jun Suyama 
Opening Theme for anime television series [[Dog Days (Japanese TV series)|Dog Days{{}}]] 
 "Shūmatsu no Love Song" (終末のラブソング, Love Song of the End)
Lyrics: Nana Mizuki
Composition: Eriko Yoshiki
Arrangement: Hitoshi Fujima (Elements Garden)
2nd Ending Theme for anime television series Cross Ange: Rondo of Angels and Dragons "Necessary" 
Lyrics: Goro Matsui
Composition: Zetta
Arrangement: EFFY
Insert song for anime television series Cross Ange: Rondo of Angels and Dragons''

Charts
Oricon Sales Chart (Japan)

References

2015 singles
Nana Mizuki songs
Songs written by Nana Mizuki
2015 songs
King Records (Japan) singles